Poultrygeist! Music From and Inspired By the Motion Picture is the soundtrack album to the 2008 musical-comedy horror film Poultrygeist: Night of the Chicken Dead, released independently through the movie's production company Troma Entertainment on October 3, 2006.

In addition to the film's musical numbers composed by Duggie Banas, Poultrygeists soundtrack features songs from numerous punk rock bands as well as snippets of dialogue from the film.

The CD soundtrack for Poultrygeist was released with a bonus DVD which included several behind-the-scenes featurettes, trailers, two music videos for Calimari Safari's "Poultrygeist" and the first five minutes of the film.

Track listing

Other songs featured in the film
The following is a list of songs featured in Poultrygeist but not included on the soundtrack album:

Zombina and the Skeletones - "Staci Stasis"
Mike Black - "Go/No-Go"
The Faint - "Dropkick the Punks"
Sorry About Dresden - "Sick and Sore"
New Duncan Imperials - "Southern Comfort on the Skids"
Amateur Death Photos - "Rock Hard Caulk"

2006 soundtrack albums
Comedy film soundtracks
Musical film soundtracks
Horror film soundtracks